Amphibalanus is a genus of barnacle of the family Balanidae that includes species formerly assigned to Balanus. It contains the following species:

Amphibalanus amphitrite (Darwin, 1854)
†Amphibalanus caboblanquensis (Weisbord, 1966) (extinct)
†Amphibalanus caribensis (Weisbord, 1966) (extinct)
Amphibalanus cirratus (Darwin, 1854)
Amphibalanus eburneus (Gould, 1841)
†Amphibalanus halosydne (Zullo & Katuna, 1992) (extinct)
†Amphibalanus hopkinsi (Zullo, 1968) (extinct)
Amphibalanus improvisus (Darwin, 1854)
Amphibalanus inexpectatus (Pilsbry, 1916)
Amphibalanus peruvianus (Pilsbry, 1909)
†Amphibalanus playagrandensis (Weisbord, 1966) (extinct)
Amphibalanus poecilotheca (Kruger, 1911)
†Amphibalanus reflexus (Zullo, 1984) (extinct)
Amphibalanus reticulatus (Utinomi, 1967)
Amphibalanus rhizophorae (Ren & Liu, 1989)
Amphibalanus salaami (Nilsson-Cantell, 1932)
Amphibalanus subalbidus (Henry, 1973)
Amphibalanus thailandicus (Puspasari, Yamaguchi & Angsupanich, 2001)
Amphibalanus variegatus (Darwin, 1854)
Amphibalanus venustus (Darwin, 1854)
Amphibalanus zhujiangensis (Ren, 1989)

References

External links

Barnacles